Jack Beckman (Born June 28, 1966 at San Fernando, California and also known as Fast Jack,) is a professional drag racer who drove a NHRA Fuel Funny Car for Don Schumacher Racing until 2020. Beckman won the SuperComp championship in 2003, his first Funny Car championship in November 2012 and achieved the third fastest Funny Car time in NHRA history in 2015. He raced the quickest time in Funny Car history earlier in that same month.

Off the track, Beckman was an instructor for Frank Hawley's Drag Racing School, the official driving instruction school of the National Hot Rod Association, and currently serves as a consultant. Over a period of 11 years, Beckman instructed over 7,000 different students. He is currently documenting the sport's history and is taking part in the Wally Parks NHRA Motorsport Museum's History of Hot Rodding.

Beckman is a former sergeant in the U.S. Air Force and in May 2013 he was presented with the U.S. Air Force Wall of Achievers honor in Enlisted Heritage Hall at Gunter Annex of Maxwell Air Force Base.

References

External links
Jack Beckman 

1966 births
Living people
Dragster drivers
People from San Fernando, California
Racing drivers from California
United States Air Force non-commissioned officers